The 1997 Pacific hurricane season was a very active hurricane season. With hundreds of deaths and hundreds of millions of dollars in damage, this season was one of the costliest and deadliest Pacific hurricane seasons. This was due to the exceptionally strong 1997–98 El Niño event. The season officially started on May 15, in the eastern Pacific, and on June 1, in the central Pacific, and lasted until November 30. These dates conventionally delimit the period of each year when almost all tropical cyclones form in the northeastern Pacific Ocean.

Several storms impacted land. The first was Tropical Storm Andres which killed four people and left another two missing. In August, Tropical Storm Ignacio took an unusual path, and its extratropical remnants caused minor damage in the Pacific Northwest and California. Linda became the most intense east Pacific hurricane in recorded history, a record it maintained until it was surpassed by Hurricane Patricia in 2015. Although it never made landfall, it produced large surf in Southern California and as a result five people had to be rescued. Hurricane Nora caused flooding and damage in the Southwestern United States, while Olaf made two landfalls and caused eighteen deaths and several other people were reported missing. Hurricane Pauline killed several hundred people and caused record damage in southeastern Mexico. In addition, Super Typhoons Oliwa and Paka originated in the region before crossing the International Date Line and causing significant damage in the western Pacific. There were also two Category 5 hurricanes: Linda and Guillermo.

Activity in the season was above average. The season produced 17 named storms, which was a little above normal. The average number of named storms per year is 15. The 1997 season also had 9 hurricanes, compared to the average of 8. There were also 7 major hurricanes compared to the average of 4.

Season summary 

The 1997 Pacific hurricane season officially started on May 15, 1997, in the Eastern Pacific, and on June 1, 1997, in the Central Pacific, and lasted until November 30, 1997. These dates conventionally delimit the period of each year when most tropical cyclones form in the northeastern Pacific Ocean. This season exceeded these boundaries appreciably, as Tropical Storm Paka formed on December 2 and dissipated 21 days later after crossing the International Date Line and then moved into the Western Pacific.

The 1997 Pacific hurricane season was fairly active, due to the strong El Niño that was occurring at the time. El Niño causes wind shear to be reduced and water temperatures to increase, resulting in conditions more conductive for tropical cyclones in the East Pacific. There were 24 tropical cyclones in total, including five unnamed tropical depressions. Of the 19 remaining tropical cyclones that became tropical storms, ten reached hurricane status (excluding Tropical Storms Oliwa and Paka, which attained typhoon status after crossing into the Western Pacific basin). Also, seven of the ten hurricanes reached Category 3 intensity or higher on the Saffir–Simpson hurricane scale, becoming major hurricanes. Multiple storms formed in nearly every month during the 1997 Pacific hurricane season.

Activity in the Central Pacific was also above average. Two tropical storms formed, as did three tropical depressions. Four tropical cyclones also moved in from the Eastern Pacific. Overall, nine tropical cyclones entered or formed in the Central Pacific in 1997, the fourth-highest number since accurate records began in 1961. The first storm, Andres, formed on June 1. The last storm, Paka, dissipated on December 23, which gives this season the second-latest known end for a Pacific hurricane season, after 2015. However, if December 6, when Paka crossed the International Date Line, is considered the end date, this season has the fourth-latest end, behind the 2015, 2010, and 1983 seasons, in addition to being tied with the 1957 season.

The National Hurricane Center uses accumulated cyclone energy (ACE) to rank hurricane seasons as above-normal, near-normal, and below-normal. The total ACE of this season is 160*104 kt2 in the east Pacific proper, which qualifies this season as above-normal.

Systems

Tropical Storm Andres 

Andres originated from a disturbance that slowly organized and formed into Tropical Depression One-E on June 1. The next day, it reached tropical storm status as a second circulation formed north-northwest of the initial circulation. However, the former circulation became dominant, and Andres intensified slightly. After a brief period of a normal track to the northwest, Andres was picked up by westerly winds and became the first named storm to threaten Central America. Initially forecast to cross the isthmus and enter the Caribbean Sea, Andres instead turned to the southeast and paralleled the coast. This was the first time since record-keeping began that any East Pacific storm had taken such a path. Andres then turned back to the northeast. It weakened to a depression and made landfall near San Salvador on June 7 and dissipated shortly thereafter.

Among the casualties were two fishers who were reported missing. Andres caused power outages, flooding rivers, several car crashes, and damage to roughly ten homes. Damage was noted in parts of Nicaragua. Andres also killed four people in Usulután, El Salvador due to heavy flooding.

Tropical Storm Blanca 
Tropical Depression Two-E formed from a broad area of low pressure on June 9. Six hours later the depression strengthened into Tropical Storm Blanca. This system developed a good outflow, and reached its peak intensity with winds of 45 mph (75 km/h). However, its circulation was not well-defined and a weakening trend began, and Blanca was downgraded to a depression on June 12. It lost its closed circulation shortly thereafter and was thus declared dissipated.

Blanca briefly threatened land on June 10 as warnings and watches were established by the Mexican Servicio Meteorológico Nacional. Shortly thereafter, a ridge of high pressure turned Blanca away from the coast. There were no major damage or casualties as Blanca's impact was generally minimal.

Tropical Depression Three-E 

Tropical Depression Three-E formed June 21. Moving rapidly westward, it never strengthened and the winds of the depression soon decreased. It dissipated early on June 24. The depression never impacted land.

Tropical Storm Carlos 

On June 22, showers increased associated with a tropical wave several hundred miles away from land. Three days later, deep convection became more concentrated, and the system became a tropical depression. It intensified into Tropical Storm Carlos as banding features increased and the outflow became better defined. As it moved west, convection diminished as Carlos moved into cooler water. Shortly thereafter, increased wind shear took its toll on Carlos as the low-level center became exposed from the deep convection. Carlos weakened into a depression early on June 27, and dissipated June 28. However, a swirl of clouds remained for a couple of days. Except for Socorro Island, which the system passed close to, Carlos never threatened land. No indications of casualties or damage were reported.

Tropical Depression Five-E 

On the afternoon of June 29, Tropical Depression Five-E formed. It erratically moved westward. On July 1, the depression weakened slightly, but quickly reintensified. It dissipated on July 4, without even threatening land.

Hurricane Dolores 

In early July, shower activity increased in association with an area of disturbed weather. With surface pressures lower than normal for a tropical disturbance, deep convection increased further and Tropical Depression Six-E formed late on July 5 and reaching tropical storm status the following day and was named Dolores. Moving westward, Dolores strengthened into the first hurricane of the season on July 7 as a ragged eye formed.

Meanwhile, Dolores became the first hurricane in over two years to cross longitude 125°W. Shortly thereafter, the hurricane started losing strength as it moved over cooler waters. The eye dissipated from satellite imagery while the associated thunderstorm activity became sheared. Dolores weakened back into a tropical storm on July 10 and a tropical depression the next day. The cyclone then crossed into the Central Pacific Hurricane Center's area of responsibility (west of longitude 140°W) while producing minimal shower activity. It dissipated on July 12. The hurricane was not a threat to any land.

Hurricane Enrique 

The first major hurricane of the season originated from a broad area of low pressure on July 8 near the Gulf of Tehuantepec. The thunderstorms gradually became more concentrated and a tropical depression formed on July 12. It strengthened into a tropical storm twelve hours later, and then began to rapidly intensify as convection increased further near the center. It became a hurricane on July 13. Enrique continued to steadily intensify and became a Category 2 hurricane on July 14. Shortly thereafter, the hurricane outflow became asymmetrical and it began to weaken over cool waters. It weakened fairly quickly and was downgraded into a Category 2 hurricane on July 15. It then lost hurricane intensity later that day. Enrique weakened into a depression the next day, and degenerated into a swirl of clouds shortly thereafter. The system never threatened land.

Hurricane Felicia 

A large area of disturbed weather formed on July 13. It then organized into a depression south of Manzanillo, Colima, on July 14. Intensification was delayed by wind shear due to its proximity to Enrique for about two days. However, it became a tropical storm late July 15 as it moved west-northwestward. Continuing to intensify, an eye formed. Based on this, Felicia was upgraded into a hurricane on July 17. Its development was again halted by increased wind shear, and as such it leveled off in intensity. After the shear decreased, Felicia began to intensify and the hurricane's winds reached  and its pressure fell to 948 mbar (hPa), making it a moderate low-end Category 4 hurricane. Shear increased for the third time, and then moved into cooler waters. It began to weaken as it moved west-northwest. On July 20, it lost major hurricane intensity. Shortly before being downgraded to a tropical storm, it crossed 140°W. A strong wind shear took toll on Felicia and it was downgraded into a tropical depression July 22. No damage or deaths were reported in wake of the hurricane.

Tropical Depression One-C 

Tropical Depression One-C formed on July 26 from a disturbance that had been showing signs of organization for the past three days. It moved west to southwest through an unfavorable environment. On the morning of July 27, it dissipated due to strong wind shear caused by an upper-level trough. The system never impacted land, thus no damage was reported.

Hurricane Guillermo 

A tropical wave emerged into the Pacific Ocean on July 27. It organized into a depression July 30 and was named Tropical Storm Guillermo the next day. It quickly intensified, reaching hurricane status on August 1. Guillermo became a major hurricane August 2. It reached Category 4 intensity on August 3. Continuing to rapidly intensify, Guillermo attained Category 5 strength August 4.

Guillermo then weakened slowly, becoming a tropical storm August 8. It crossed 140°W and entered the Central Pacific. It weakened to a depression late August 10, but restrengthened back into a storm 24 hours later when it encountered a small area of warmer water. It weakened to a depression for the second and final time August 15 and became an extratropical cyclone early the next day. The storm's remnants recurved over the far northern Pacific. The remnants persisted for a few more days and drifted south before being absorbed by a mid-latitude cyclone August 24 off the coast of California.

Tropical Storm Hilda 

A tropical wave that had showed signs of development emerged into the East Pacific and organized into Tropical Depression Ten-E on August 10. Despite some wind shear, the depression managed to become a tropical storm late on August 11. Hilda reached its peak intensity as a moderate 50 mph (85 km/h) tropical storm the next day. After maintaining its peak intensity for 24 hours, it gradually weakened due to increasing wind shear On August 14, shear weakened Hilda to a depression and the cyclone dissipated early the next morning. Hilda was no threat to land and caused no known damage or deaths.

Tropical Storm Ignacio 

Tropical Storm Ignacio formed first as a depression in an area of disturbed weather on August 17. Twelve hours later, it organized into a tropical storm. Its location of tropical cyclone formation was further north and west of where most East Pacific tropical cyclones develop. Steering currents pulled Ignacio north, where it encountered wind shear and cooler waters. Ignacio never intensified beyond 40 mph (65 km/h) and then was downgraded into a depression on August 18. It last transitioned into an extratropical cyclone 24 hours later. It was then absorbed by a cyclone associated with the remnants of Hurricane Guillermo.

Ignacio's remnants moved north, bringing gusty winds to California coastal waters before dissipating. They caused rainfall as far north as the U.S. state of Washington. Thunderstorms caused power outages in central California.

Hurricane Jimena 

During the third week of August, a tropical disturbance formed far from land. Although the system was located over warmer than average sea surface temperatures, the upper-level environment was initially unfavorable. However the environment gradually became more conducive for tropical cyclone formation and Tropical Depression Twelve-E formed August 25 from an area of disturbed weather in a rather easterly location. It became a tropical storm the next day and a hurricane on August 27. Continuing to rapidly intensify, it reached its peak intensity as a low-end category 4 hurricane. Jimena completely dissipated on August 30, not long after entering the Central Pacific Basin. Hurricane Jimena was of no threat to land.

Tropical Storm Oliwa 

Tropical storm Oliwa began as a tropical disturbance that had meandered south of Johnston Atoll. It organized into Tropical Depression Two-C on September 2. Later that day, it was upgraded to Tropical Storm Oliwa (Hawaiian for Oliver) as it slowly moved towards the west. It crossed the dateline late on September 3 and entered the Joint Typhoon Warning Center's Area of Responsibility.
Oliwa passed south of Wake Island on September 6, where it caused heavy rains but no damage. On September 7, Oliwa started a period of rapid strengthening, becoming a typhoon on September 8 and a Super Typhoon eight hours later. Oliwa stayed at that intensity for over two days. While still a strong typhoon, Oliwa passed near the Northern Marianas Islands. It then started weakening as it curved towards Japan. It made landfall as a minimal typhoon September 16. It quickly dissipated later that same day. Typhoon Oliwa caused 12 fatalities and left 30,000 people homeless. Damage totaled to 4.36 billion yen ($50.1 million USD).

Tropical Storm Kevin 

Tropical Storm Kevin, first displayed hints of development while located near Panama, and developed a well-defined circulation after emerging into the Pacific. It was classified as a tropical depression in the Pacific on September 3 while located south-south west of Baja California. Convection increased and the outflow of the storm became better defined. As such, it became a tropical storm on the morning of September 4. Gradually intensifying, it reached it peak intensity as a mid-level tropical storm on September 5. As it moved westbound, it maintained its intensity for 12 hours. The environment was unfavorable, and two days later, Kevin weakened to a depression when deep convection ceased. It dissipated early on September 7, having never posed a threat to land.

Hurricane Linda 

A tropical disturbance formed on September 9 and became Tropical Depression Fourteen-E later that day. The cyclone moved northwest and strengthened into a tropical storm on September 10. Linda then rapidly intensified, reaching hurricane intensity the next day as an eye formed. On September 12, Linda reached its peak intensity, with maximum sustained winds of —making it a Category 5 hurricane on the Saffir-Simpson Hurricane Scale—and a minimum pressure of 902 mbar (902 hPa), making it the most intense Pacific hurricane ever recorded until Hurricane Patricia surpassed it in 2015. However, Linda soon moved over cooler waters, and began to weaken, falling below hurricane intensity on September 16. It then slowly weakened and dissipated on September 17.

Linda passed very near Socorro Island. In addition, early forecasts predicted that Linda would make landfall in California. The landfall never materialized and warnings or watches were not necessary for any location. However, Linda caused large surf, which crashed ashore in California, where it swept five people off a jetty. Moisture related to Linda also contributed to a landslide in southern California that destroyed or damaged 79 houses.

Tropical Storm Marty 

An area of disturbed weather formed early on September 10. It became better organized two days later as convection increased, and then organized into Tropical Depression Fifteen-E late on September 12. Moving slowly in a westward direction, it strengthened into a tropical storm in the morning of September 14. Meanwhile, the storm's forward speed slowed down even more, and it turned to the south. It then encountered an area of strong wind shear, and it weakened into a depression on September 15 as the center of circulation became displaced from the deep convection. The shear continued to weaken, and the tropical cyclone dissipated late on September 16. There were no deaths or damage.

Hurricane Nora 

A large area of disturbed weather moved into the Pacific on September 12. It then organized into Tropical Depression Sixteen-E on September 16 and quickly strengthened into a tropical storm. Early on September 18, a poorly defined and ragged eye appeared on infrared imagery. Shortly thereafter, its winds reached . Nora eventually peaked at Category 4. It then encountered water temperature anomalies, and fluctuated in strength. Then, a trough pulled Nora northward and accelerated the storm. After weakening to a Category 1, Nora made landfall in northern Baja California and stayed a tropical storm as it entered the United States. At that time, however, most of the deep rest convection was displaced to the northeast. Nora dissipated over Arizona, but its remnants kept going north.

Hurricane Nora was the first Pacific hurricane to bring gale-force winds to the Continental United States since Kathleen in 1976. In Mexico, Nora produced high waves, flooding, and heavy damage. Many homes were destroyed. In the United States, rains were heavy, and damage amounted to several hundred million dollars. Several hundred people were rendered homeless, and there was wind and flood damage in Arizona. Nora killed two people in Mexico, and several indirect deaths were reported in California.

Tropical Storm Olaf 

A tropical disturbance left Central America on September 22. Despite some wind shear, the system gradually became better organized and a tropical depression formed September 26, being upgraded to a tropical storm several hours later. The cyclone immediately moved north. Instead of strengthening into a hurricane before landfall as forecasted, Olaf weakened due to its proximity to land. On September 29, Olaf made landfall near Salina Cruz, Oaxaca.

Olaf, as a tropical depression, moved westward, far out to sea. Operationally, Olaf was believed to have dissipated for six days. however, in the Tropical Cyclone Report, a report issued several months after the hurricane's duration, it was believed to have remained a tropical cyclone the entire time. After restrengthening slightly, Olaf moved southeast on October 5 due to the influence of Hurricane Pauline. Olaf then turned north, and on October 12 made a second landfall near Manzanillo, Colima, as a tropical depression. Olaf's surface circulation weakened, and its remnants moved back out to sea, but did not redevelop.

Olaf resulted in some reports of damage and flooding in Mexico and Guatemala. Several people were reported missing. Most of its damage was from its first landfall. Throughout southern Mexico, Guatemala and El Salvador, flooding caused by Olaf was blamed for eighteen deaths.

Hurricane Pauline 

On October 3, a distinct area of disturbed weather formed. It drifted eastbound, and a well-defined low pressure soon formed. It became Tropical Depression Eighteen-E on October 5. Early the next day it intensified into tropical Storm Pauline. An eye feature developed on October 7 and as such Pauline was upgraded into a hurricane. In a favorable environment, the cyclone rapidly intensified, reaching Category 4 intensity. After fluctuating in intensity, interaction with land weakened Pauline to a Category 2 by the time it made landfall on October 9. It accelerated to the northwest, and passed over a mountainous region. The mountains disrupted Pauline's circulation, and squeezed the moisture from the hurricane. Pauline dissipated on October 10 while over Jalisco.

Hurricane Pauline was the deadliest storm of the season. Landslides and flooding caused by heavy rain caused tragic loss of life and left thousands homeless. There were at least 230 casualties. The Red Cross reported that 400 people died, but this was disputed by Mexican officials. Pauline was Mexico's deadliest hurricane since 1976's Liza. In addition, the hurricane caused $447.8 million in damage (1997 USD; $473 million 2008 USD).

Tropical Depression Three-C 

A tropical disturbance formed near 140°W. It became Tropical Depression Three-C on October 6. The waters were very warm, and there was only moderate wind shear. However, the depression slowly moved westward without intensifying, and dissipated the next day.

Tropical Depression Four-C 

Towards the end of October, a tropical disturbance developed well to the southeast of the Hawaiian Islands and became better organized over the next few days, as it moved westwards along 10°N. During October 31, after atmospheric convection had increased, the CPHC initiated advisories and designated the system as Tropical Depression Four-C.

Although the waters were very warm, some dry air was located north of the system. It slowly moved westward without intensifying, and dissipated the next day as the circulation became exposed.

Hurricane Rick 

The first hurricane in November since 1991 formed from a tropical disturbance. Although the circulation was initially poorly defined, it later acquired enough organization and was classified as a tropical depression on November 7. It moved north until a trough of low pressure turned it to the northeast. It was named on November 8, and was upgraded to a hurricane the next day. It reached its peak intensity of 100 mph (160 km/h) and 973 mbar (hPa). Rick made landfall in Oaxaca – the same area devastated by Hurricane Pauline one month earlier – and quickly weakened, dissipating early on November 11.

The storm downed trees, washed out recently repaired roads, and disrupted communications in some small population centers. No one was killed.

Tropical Storm Paka 

Tropical Depression Five-C formed on December 2, two days after the season ended. It was the second December tropical depression east of the dateline; 1983's Hurricane Winnie was the only other one. The depression strengthened into Tropical Storm Paka (Hawaiian for Pat) while west of Palmyra Atoll. The system began to move westward at a steady pace. As Paka moved westward, dry air and wind shear disrupted its development until it crossed the dateline on December 6.

After entering the Western Pacific, the cyclone encountered a more favorable environment, resulting in rapid intensification. It strengthened further, twice reaching Category 5 intensity. While a super typhoon, Paka passed close to Guam on December 17, causing major damage. Afterwards, Paka encountered a hostile environment and had completely dissipated by the evening of December 22.

Due to the high damages, Paka was retired and replaced with Pama.

Season effects 
This is a table of all the tropical cyclones that formed in the 1997 Pacific hurricane season. It includes their duration, names, intensities, areas affected, damages, and death totals. Deaths in parentheses are additional and indirect (an example of an indirect death would be a traffic accident), but were still related to that storm. Damage and deaths include totals while the storm was extratropical, a wave, or a low, and all the damage figures are in 1997 USD.

Storm names 
The following names were used for named storms that formed in the eastern Pacific in 1997. Names that were not assigned are marked in gray. The names not retired from this list were used again in the 2003 season. This is the same list used for the 1991 season except for Felicia, which replaced Fefa. A storm was named Felicia for the first time in 1997. Also, the name "Dolores" was misspelled "Delores" in the 1991 season in this and subsequent seasons, the typo was corrected.

For storms that form in the Central Pacific Hurricane Center's area of responsibility, encompassing the area between 140 degrees west and the International Date Line, all names are used in a series of four rotating lists. The next four names that were slated for use in 1997 are shown below, however, only two of them were used.

Retirement 

The World Meteorological Organization retired one name in the spring of 1998: Pauline. It was replaced in the 2003 season by Patricia. In 2006, a name from the Central Pacific list was retired due to its effects west of the International Dateline in this season: Paka. The name Pama was chosen as the replacement name.

See also 

 List of Pacific hurricanes
 Pacific hurricane season
 1997 Atlantic hurricane season
 1997 Pacific typhoon season
 1997 North Indian Ocean cyclone season
 South-West Indian Ocean cyclone seasons: 1996–97, 1997–98
 Australian region cyclone seasons: 1996–97, 1997–98
 South Pacific cyclone seasons: 1996–97, 1997–98

Notes

References

External links 
 NHC 1997 Pacific hurricane season archive
 HPC 1997 Tropical Cyclone Rainfall Pages
 Central Pacific Hurricane Center archive
 Unisys Hurricane Tracks

 
Pacific hurricane seasons
Articles which contain graphical timelines